The Church of la Magdalena (Spanish: Iglesia de la Magdalena) is a Gothic-style church located in Torrelaguna, central Spain. It was declared Bien de Interés Cultural in 1983.

It has a nave and two aisles, with Gothic vaults supported by flying buttresses between which are the side chapels, each with movable retablos. The bell tower dates to the 15th century, and was commissioned by Cardinal Cisneros, whose coat of arms, together with those of the town, can be seen externally on the third floor. The so-called "Portal of the Resurrection" (16th century) is in mixed Mudéjar–Renaissance style. The high altar is by Narciso Tomé.

References 

15th-century Roman Catholic church buildings in Spain
Magdalena
Gothic architecture in the Community of Madrid
Bien de Interés Cultural landmarks in the Community of Madrid